Amylocystis is a genus of two species of fungi in the family Fomitopsidaceae. The genus was described in 1944 by mycologists Appollinaris Semenovich Bondartsev and Rolf Singer to contain the type, and at that time, sole species, A. lapponicus. A. unicolor was transferred to the genus (from Tyromyces) in 2003.

References

Fomitopsidaceae
Polyporales genera
Taxa named by Rolf Singer
Taxa described in 1944